Edward Antill may refer to:

 Edward Antill (attorney) (1658–1725), English-born New York City merchant and attorney
 Edward Antill (colonial politician) (1701–1770), his son, New Jersey plantation owner, winemaker, and political figure
 Edward Antill (soldier) (1742–1789), his son, Continental Army Lieutenant Colonel noted for his service in the Battle of Quebec (1775)